Francis Xavier Dercum (August 10, 1856 – April 24, 1931) was an American physician who first described the disease Adiposis dolorosa (also known as Dercum's disease).  He was a noted neurologist and specialised in treating nervous and mental disorders.  He treated President Woodrow Wilson in 1919, and  Ima Hogg for three years, beginning in 1918.

Life and career
Dercum was born in Philadelphia, Pennsylvania.  He was educated at the local high school and attended medical school of the University of Pennsylvania.  He received his medical degree in 1877.  He began his medical practice and served as a consultant pathologist at the State Mental Hospital in Norristown, Pennsylvania.  In 1879, at the University of Pennsylvania, he was a demonstrator in histology.  In 1881, he was demonstrator in the physiology laboratory, and in 1882, he was an instructor in nervous diseases, also at the University of Pennsylvania.  From 1883 to 1892, Dercum served as chief of the Nervous Disease Clinic (University of Pennsylvania).  He joined the staff of the Philadelphia General Hospital in 1887.  In 1911, he became a consulting neurologist at the hospital.

Dercum pursued research endeavors.  He studied the semicircular canals and, in 1879, he published an article on their morphology.  In 1892, he was the first to publish a description of Adiposis dolorosa.  He published over 200 articles including several textbooks, in the medical areas of anatomy, physiology, pathology, psychology, and therapeutics.

In 1892, Jefferson Medical College (Philadelphia) established a Chair in nervous and mental diseases, and Dercum was the first occupant of the post (1892-1925, then Emeritus).   He was a consultant to numerous psychiatric hospitals including the Pennsylvania State Hospitals at Wernersville and Norristown, and the hospital for the criminally insane at Fairview.

Dercum was active in many professional and learned societies.  He was a founding member of the Philadelphia Neurological Society in 1884, and served as vice president from 1884 to 1885.  He was president of the American Neurological Association in 1886, and was a fellow of the American College of Physicians.  He served as chairman for the section on Nervous and Mental Diseases of the American Medical Association in 1915.  He held memberships in neurological societies in Vienna, Budapest and London, and was elected to the Neurological Society of Paris.  In 1923, the French government awarded him the Chevalier of the Legion of Honor.

During World War I, he served on the Pennsylvania Medical Advisory Board and the Medical Reserve Board, and lectured on neurology to medical officers of the U.S. Army and U.S. Navy.

When President Wilson collapsed in The White House in October 1919, Dr. Dercum was called to diagnose and attend him within a few hours. It was he who advised that the President remain in office despite his crippling thrombosis, since with such resignation "the greatest incentive to recovery is gone." It was also Dercum who encouraged the president's wife, Edith Bolling Wilson, to stand in as his virtual substitute.

Dercum died in 1931 while presiding over a meeting of the American Philosophical Society.  He is interred at West Laurel Hill Cemetery, Woodlawn Section, Lot 38, Bala Cynwyd, Pennsylvania.

Works

A Textbook on Nervous Diseases, Philadelphia, Lea Brothers & Co., 1895.  https://archive.org/details/textbookonnervou00derc  
“Report of Three Cases of Beri-Beri,” Journal of Nervous & Mental Disease 20(2) (Feb. 1895): 103-109.
“Two cases of Adiposa Dolorosa,” Transactions. College of Physicians of Philadelphia (1902). 
Rest, Mental Therapeutics, Suggestion, 1903
A Clinical Manual of Mental Diseases.  Philadelphia; London: W. B. Saunders Co., 1913.  https://archive.org/details/39002010914035.med.yale.edu 
“The Treatment of Mental Affections as they are Met with in General Practice,” New York Medical Journal (March 13, 1915). 
Hysteria and accident compensation: Nature of Hysteria and the Lesson of the Post-Litigation Results, 1916.
“Metabolism in Insanity,” Journal of the American Medical Association (April 15, 1916): 1183-1188. 
A Clinical Manual of Mental Diseases, 1917.
Rest, Suggestion, and Other Therapeutic Measures in Nervous and Mental Disease. Philadelphia: P. Blakiston’s Son & Co., 1917.  https://archive.org/details/cu31924003706615  
“The Interpretation of the Neuroses: Biologic, Pathologic and Clinical Considerations, together with an Evaluation of the Psychogenic Factors,” Journal of the American Medical Association (April 28, 1917): 1223-1227. 
An Essay on the Physiology of Mind: An Interpretation based on Biological, Morphological, Physical and Chemical Considerations.  Philadelphia; London: W. B. Saunders Co., 1922.  https://archive.org/details/cu31924029080709  
The Biology of the Internal Secretions, Philadelphia and London: W.B. Saunders Co., 1924.

Footnotes

References

External links
The Dercum Society at www.dercumsociety.com

1856 births
1931 deaths
American neurologists
Physicians from Philadelphia
Perelman School of Medicine at the University of Pennsylvania alumni
University of Pennsylvania faculty
Thomas Jefferson University faculty
Chevaliers of the Légion d'honneur